The 1986 Coupe de France Final was a football match held at Parc des Princes, Paris on April 30, 1986, that saw FC Girondins de Bordeaux defeat Olympique de Marseille 2–1 thanks to goals by Jean Tigana and Alain Giresse.

Match details

See also
Coupe de France 1985-86

External links
Coupe de France results at Rec.Sport.Soccer Statistics Foundation
Report on French federation site

Coupe
1986
Coupe De France Final 1986
Coupe De France Final 1986
Coupe De France Final
Coupe De France Final